Jamalpur is a district in Bangladesh, part of the Mymensingh Division. It was established in 1978.

Geography 
Jamalpur occupies 2031.98 km2. It is located between 24°34' and 25°26' North and between 89°40' and 90°12' East. It shares an international border with the Indian state of Meghalaya in the North East. It is surrounded by Kurigram and Sherpur districts in the North, Tangail district in the South, Mymensingh and Sherpur districts in the East, Jamuna River, Bogra, Sirajganj and Gaibandha districts in the West.

Main rivers include Bangali, Old Brahmaputra, Banal, Hinayana, Hark Eel, Kaiser Reel, Karaganda Lake.

History 
The most notable historical events include the Fakir-Sannyasi Resistance (1772-1790), the Indigo Resistance Movement (1829), Famine (1874), the advent of rail (1899), and the War of Liberation in 1971.

War of Liberation 
On June 21, 1971, the Pakistani army, in collaboration with the local Razakars, killed 9 people at the Shashan Ghat (cremation center) at Jamalpur Sadar Upazila on the bank of the Brahmaputra. Bengali fighters and the Pakistani army on July 31 fought at Kamalpur Pakistani Army Base of Bakshiganj Upazila, with heavy losses to the occupation army. In this battle, 35 freedom fighters including Capt. Salauddin Mumtaz, Ahaduzzaman, Abul Kalam Azad were killed. A battle was fought between Bengali troops under Sector Commander Colonel Abu Taher and the Pakistani army on November 13 at Kamalpur of Bakshiganj Upazila. Taher was seriously wounded.

The small Pakistani military base at Kamalpur fell on December 4, following a heavy attack by rebels lasting 21 days. In this battle, 220 Pakistani soldiers under the command of Captain Ahsan Malik surrendered.

The Jamalpur garrison was commanded by Sultan Ahmed and lasted about a week. Sultan earned renown among the Pakistanis when he refused to surrender to the Indian commander, Hardev Kler, telling him to use a sten not a pen. This front, together with the Rangpur-Bogra front further west, was the only front where Pakistani troops held out during the war. However, on December 10, 1971, they were ordered to withdraw to Dhaka. During this retreat their commander Abdul-Qadir Niazi fell into enemy custody, giving the Bangladeshis and Indians a morale boost.

Economy 

Jamalpur is a market center for local rice, sugarcane, jute, tobacco and mustard. The town's main exports are jute, tobacco, mustard seed, peanut, leather, egg, pulse, betel leaf, and handicrafts. Making nakshi kantha (embroidered quilts) is a traditional occupation. An economic zone is established in Jamalpur by BEZA. The objective of this project is to attract foreign and local investment to industrialize the country for export promotion and to meet the requirements of local areas that lead to employment generation and economic development of the country.

Transport 
The district is connected by road, rail, and river with Dhaka and the rest of the country. It has a railway station and three Dak bungalows.

Demographics 

According to the 2011 Bangladesh census, Jamalpur District had a population of 2,292,674, of which 1,128,724 were males and 1,163,950 females. Rural population was 1,904,805 (83.08%) while the urban population was 387,869 (16.92%). Jamalpur District had a literacy rate of 38.4% for the population 7 years and above: 41.1% for males and 35.9% for females.

Muslims were the predominant religion with 98.25% of the population while Hindus were 1.69% of the population. Jamalpur district has the highest percentage of Muslims relative to the total population of any district in Bangladesh.

Subdistricts 

The district is divided into seven upazilas & one police I.C

Culture 
Folk music is popular in the district. Popular songs include "Gunaibibir Gan", "Jari Gan of Khairun", "Palagan of Rupvan", "Panchali", "Ghetu Gan" and "Meyeli geet" (songs sung by women on the occasion of marriage and Gaye Holud festivals). In the rural areas, various games and sports practice. These competitions include bullfights, horse racing, Moi (ladder) race, and Lathi Khela (stick game). During the rainy season, boat races are arranged in the Jamuna river. The Garo community perform dances at the 'Bigan Gala' festival.

Notable people 

 Nazrul Islam Babu, lyricist.
 Khaled Mosharraf, freedom fighter and sector commander of Bangladesh Liberation War.
 Amjad Hossain, filmmaker, actor, and writer.
 Abdullah al Mamun, actor and producer.
 Anwar Hossain (actor),film actor. 
 Abdus Salam Talukder, founder general secretary of Bangladesh Nationalist Party and former LGRD Minister of the People's Republic of Bangladesh.
 Rashed Mosharraf, former central president of Bangladesh Krishak League and state minister for Land of the People's Republic of Bangladesh.
 Abul Kalam Azad, former Information Minister
 Monwar Hossain Nannu, footballer
 Mirza Azam, MP and former central general secretary of Bangladesh Awami Jubo-league and state minister for Jute and Textile of the People's Republic of Bangladesh.
Anwarul Kabir Talukdar, former MP and state minister for LGRD of the People's republic of Bangladesh.
 Sirajul Islam, former MP and deputy health minister of the People's Republic of Bangladesh.
ABM Abdullah, physician and academic. 
 Hasan Hafizur Rahman, poet of the 50s.
 Atiur Rahman, economist and former Governor of Bangladesh Bank.

See also 
 Districts of Bangladesh
 History of Mymensingh

Notes

References 

 
Districts of Bangladesh
Districts of Mymensingh Division